The Sankaty Head Light is a lighthouse located on Nantucket island.  It was built in 1850, was automated in 1965, and is still in operation.  It is located at the easternmost point of the island, in the village of Siasconset.  It was one of the first lighthouses in the United States to receive a Fresnel lens.

History
The shoals off the eastern coast of Nantucket had a long history as a hazard to navigation. The United States government decided in the 1840s that a prominent lighthouse should be erected to alert mariners to that hazard. Congress appropriated $12,000 for its construction in 1848, with additional funds totaling $8,000 in following years. The light went into service in February 1850. The light's turning mechanism was powered by a weight-driven brass clockwork,

A brick house was built next to the tower at the time of its construction to house the light keeper's family. In 1887 this house was torn down and a new structure was built.

In 1933 the light was electrified, and the mechanical works to turn it were taken out of service.  Its original lens was removed in 1950, and is now at the Nantucket Whaling Museum.  The light was fully automated in 1965.

In 1987, the lighthouse was listed on the National Register of Historic Places as the Sankaty Head Light.
The 'Sconset Trust acquired the lighthouse in 2007, and had it moved away from the eroding bluff (approximately ) in October of that year.

See also
 National Register of Historic Places listings in Nantucket County, Massachusetts

References

External links
Sconset Trust website
NPS - Historic light stations - Sankaty Head Light
Moving of Sankaty Lighthouse Due To Erosion 
 "Sankaty Light: 'I see Sankaty, the mariner’s friend!' The future of Nantucket's "blazing star", by Robert D. Felch. Originally published by the Nantucket Historical Association in the Historic Nantucket, Vol. 56, No. 3 (Summer 2007).
 Sankaty Light, 1849 from Nantucket Historical Association's Digital Exhibition: 'Sconset 02564

Lighthouses completed in 1850
Lighthouses on the National Register of Historic Places in Massachusetts
National Register of Historic Places in Nantucket, Massachusetts
Relocated buildings and structures in Massachusetts
Lighthouses in Nantucket, Massachusetts